, is a Japanese middleweight kickboxer competing in RISE. He is the former SHOOTBOXING and RISE Heavyweight champion.

Kyokushin Karate career
Started doing Kyokushin Karate at the age of 16, joining Kyokushin Kaikan Tokyo Itabashi Dojo. Achieved last 8 at 20th All Japan Weight Category Tournament at the age of 19. His biggest achievement was 2nd place at 24th All Japan Weight Category Tournament, where he fought as heavyweight and lost to Osamu Shiojima. That qualified him for 9th World Open Tournament, but he didn't make remarkable achievement.

Kickboxing career
He made pro debout in 2006, fighting mostly in RISE promotion. In 2012, with a promotion record of 8-1, he rematched Raoumaru for vacant RISE Heavyweight title. Shimizu dominated the fight, just like the first fight, this time scoring 3rd-round knockout with a high kick.

Next year he dropped weight and fought for vacant RISE Light Heavyweight title against, making a revanche against Makoto Uehara at RISE 92 in Tokyo, Japan. Uehara got the split decision victory, with a point deduction from Shimizu in the second.

He dropped weight again and won Road to Glory Japan -85 kg tournament on March 3, 2013, defeating Yuki Niimura and Magnum Sakai by decisions on the same night and joined Glory's middleweight division.

He made Glory debout on September 28, 2013, replacing Steve Wakeling and joining Glory 10: Los Angeles - Middleweight World Championship Tournament. He lost in semi finals to eventual winner Joe Schilling by unanimous decision.

He was scheduled to fight Hiromi Amada at RISE 99. He won the fight by a third round head kick KO.

Shimizu participated in the 2015 Shootboxing Heavyweight tournament. He scored a first round knockout of Shakar Peterson in the semifinals. He won the final against Nangoku Chojin by a first round KO as well.

He successfully defended his RISE Heavyweight title with a unanimous decision win against Badr Ferdaous.

Titles and achievements
Kickboxing
2015 Shootboxing Heavyweight Tournament Winner
2013 Road to Glory Japan 85kg Tournament Winner
2012 RISE Heavyweight champion +100 kg (1 Title Def.)
Kyokushin Karate – IKO 1
2011 10th World Open Tournament, Participated
2011 28th All Japan Weight Category Tournament, heavyweight, Last 8
2007 9th World Open Tournament, Participated
2007 24th All Japan Weight Category Tournament, heavyweight 
2005 22nd All Japan Weight Category Tournament, heavyweight, Last 8
2004 21st All Japan Weight Category Tournament, heavyweight, Last 8
2003 20th All Japan Weight Category Tournament, Last 8

Kickboxing record

|-   
|-  bgcolor="#fbb"
| 2018-11-17 || Loss ||align=left| Siala Siliga || RISE 129 || Tokyo, Japan || TKO (Punches) || 3 || 0:55 || 28-7
|-   
|-  bgcolor="#cfc"
| 2018-09-16 || Win ||align=left| Badr Ferdaous || RISE 127 || Tokyo, Japan || Decision (Unanimous) || 3 || 3:00 || 28-6
|-   
! style=background:white colspan=9 |  
|-   
|-  bgcolor="#fbb"
| 2018-06-17 || Loss ||align=left| Badr Ferdaous || RISE 125 || Tokyo, Japan || TKO (Punches) || 1 || 2:52 || 27-6
|-   
|-  bgcolor="#CCFFCC"
| 2018-03-24 || Win ||align=left| David Trallero || RISE 123 || Tokyo, Japan || KO (Left hook) || 2 || 1:27 || 27-5
|-   
|-  bgcolor="#CCFFCC"
| 2017-11-22 || Win ||align=left| Hiromitsu Miura  || Shoot Boxing GROUND ZERO TOKYO 2017 || Tokyo, Japan || KO (Left hook) || 2 || 1:40 || 26-5
|-   
|-  bgcolor="#CCFFCC"
| 2017-05-20 || Win ||align=left| Jae Gun Yang || RISE 117 || Tokyo, Japan || KO (Right straight) || 3 || 0:14 || 25-5
|- 
|-   
|-  bgcolor="#CCFFCC"
| 2016-03-26 || Win ||align=left| Luis Morais || RISE 110 || Tokyo, Japan || Extra round decision (Unanimous) || 4 || 3:00 || 24-5
|-
|-
|-  bgcolor="#CCFFCC"
| 2015-12-01 || Win ||align=left| Nangoku Chojin || Shoot Boxing GROUND ZERO TOKYO 2015, Final || Tokyo, Japan || KO || 1 || 1:09  || 23-5
|-   
! style=background:white colspan=9 |   
|- 
|-  bgcolor="#CCFFCC"
| 2015-12-01 || Win ||align=left| Shakar Peterson || Shoot Boxing GROUND ZERO TOKYO 2015, Semi Finals || Tokyo, Japan || KO || 1 || 1:03 || 22-5
|-  
|-  bgcolor="#CCFFCC"
| 2015-05-31 || Win ||align=left| Alex Roberts || RISE 105 (-100 kg)  || Tokyo, Japan || Decision (Split) || 3 || 3:00 || 21-5
|- 
|-  bgcolor="#CCFFCC"
| 2015-01-24 || Win ||align=left| Yuji Sakuragi || RISE 103 (-92 kg)  || Tokyo, Japan || TKO (3 Knockdowns) || 1 || 2:25 || 20-5
|-  
|-  bgcolor="#CCFFCC"
| 2014-11-16 || Win ||align=left| Kim Hyung Min || RISE 102  || Tokyo, Japan || KO (Left hook) || 2 || 1:03 || 19-5
|-
|-  bgcolor="#FFBBBB"
| 2014-07-12 || Loss || align=left| Magnum Sakai || RISE 100 -Blade 0-  (-95 kg)|| Ota, Tokyo, Japan || Decision (Unanimous) || 3 || 3:00 || 18-5
|-
|-  bgcolor="#CCFFCC"
| 2014-04-29 || Win ||align=left| Hiromi Amada || RISE 99 || Tokyo, Japan || KO (High kick) || 3|| 1:47 ||18-4
|-   
! style=background:white colspan=9 |   
|-  
|-  bgcolor="#CCFFCC"
| 2014-01-25 || Win ||align=left| Takikawa Ryou || RISE 97 || Tokyo, Japan || KO (Knee) || 2 || 1:36 ||17-4
|-  
|-  bgcolor="#FFBBBB"
| 2013-09-28 || Loss ||align=left| Joe Schilling || Glory 10: Los Angeles – Middleweight World Championship Tournament, Semi Finals || Ontario, California, US || Decision (Unanimous) || 3 || 3:00||16-4
|-
|-  bgcolor="#CCFFCC"
| 2013-03-03 || Win ||align=left| Magnum Sakai || Road to Glory Japan 85 kg Tournament, Final || Tokyo, Japan || Decision (Majority) || 3 || 3:00  ||16-3
|-   
! style=background:white colspan=9 |   
|- 
|-  bgcolor="#CCFFCC"
| 2013-03-03 || Win ||align=left| Yuki Niimura || Road to Glory Japan 85 kg Tournament, Semi Finals || Tokyo, Japan || Decision (Unanimous) || 3 || 3:00  ||15-3
|-  
|-  bgcolor="#FFBBBB"
| 2013-03-17 || Loss ||align=left| Makoto Uehara || RISE 92 || Tokyo, Japan || Decision (Split) || 3 || 3:00  ||14-3
|-   
! style=background:white colspan=9 |   
|-  
|-  bgcolor="#CCFFCC"
| 2012-10-25 || Win ||align=left| Raoumaru || RISE 90 || Japan || KO (Head kick) || 3 || 1:30 ||14-2
|-   
! style=background:white colspan=9 |   
|- 
|-  bgcolor="#CCFFCC"
| 2012-05-02 || Win ||align=left| Raoumaru || RISE 88 || Japan || KO (Knee to body) || 1 ||1:30||13-2  
|-  
|-  bgcolor="#CCFFCC"
| 2012-03-24 || Win ||align=left| Hidekazu Kimura || RISE 87 || Japan || Decision (Unanimous) || 3 || 3:00||12-2
|-  
|-  bgcolor="#CCFFCC"
| 2012-01-28 || Win ||align=left| Nori || RISE 86 || Japan || KO (Head kick) || 1 || 1:54||11-2
|-  
|-  bgcolor="#CCFFCC"
| 2011-02-27 || Win ||align=left| Tsutomu Takahagi || RISE 74 || Japan || KO (Head kick) || 3 || 2:40||10-2
|-  
|-  bgcolor="#CCFFCC"
| 2010-12-19 || Win ||align=left| Ismael Aoki || RISE 73R || Japan || KO || 1 || 1:50||9-2
|- 
|-  bgcolor="#CCFFCC"
| 2010-11-23 || Win ||align=left| Shunsuke Inoue || S-Cup World Tournament Final 2010, Super fight  || Japan || KO (Head kick) || 3 || 2:40||8-2
|- 
|-  bgcolor="#FFBBBB"
| 2010-07-31 || Loss ||align=left| Makoto Uehara || RISE 68 || Tokyo, Japan || KO (Left high kick) || 3 || 1:24||7-2
|-  bgcolor="#CCFFCC"
| 2010-05-16 || Win ||align=left| Tanya Mainochi || RISE 65  || Japan || KO （Right straight） || 1 || 2:50||7-1
|- 
|-  bgcolor="#CCFFCC"
| 2010-01-24 || Win ||align=left| Hukuda Yuuhei || RISE 61  || Japan || KO (Knee) || 1 || 2:07||6-1
|- 
|-  bgcolor="#CCFFCC"
| 2009-10-04 || Win ||align=left| Ikeno Age || RISE 59  || Japan || TKO (3 Knockdowns) || 2 || 2:01||5-1
|- 
|-  bgcolor="#CCFFCC"
| 2009-08-11 || Win ||align=left| Shinkyu Kawano || K-1 World Grand Prix 2009 in Tokyo Final 16 Qualifying GP ||Tokyo, Japan || KO (Knee) || 1 || 0:34||4-1
|-
|-  bgcolor="#CCFFCC"
| 2009-06-01 || Win ||align=left| Iga Koji || 武志道-bushido-其の参  || Japan || KO (Right hook) || 1 || ||3-1
|- 
|-  bgcolor="#FFBBBB"
| 2008-12-07 || Loss ||align=left| Peterson Shakaru || Trial League  || Japan || KO (Doctor stoppage) || 2 || ||2-1
|- 
|-  bgcolor="#CCFFCC"
| 2008-10-12 || Win ||align=left| Nasser Amadian || Trial League  || Japan || KO (Right straight) || 2 || 1:30||2-0
|- 
|-  bgcolor="#CCFFCC"
| 2006-03-12 || Win ||align=left| Nobuhiro Tsurumaki || Trial League  || Japan || TKO (3 Knockdowns) || 1 || 2:42||1-0
|- 
|-
| colspan=9 | Legend:

See also
 List of male kickboxers

References

External links
Profile at gloryworldseries.com
Profile at k-1sport.de

1983 births
Living people
Japanese male kickboxers
Heavyweight kickboxers
Light heavyweight kickboxers
Middleweight kickboxers
Kyokushin kaikan practitioners
Japanese male karateka